A hinged arch bridge is one with hinges incorporated into its structure to allow movement. The most common varieties are the two-hinged bridge with hinges at the springing points and the three-hinged bridge with an additional hinge at the crown of the arch; though single-hinged versions exist with a hinge only at the crown of the arch.  Hinges at the springing point prevent bending moments from being transferred to the bridge abutments.  A triple-hinged bridge is statically determinate, while the other versions are not.

Description 
A fixed arch bridge, that is one without hinges, exerts a bending moment at the abutments and stresses caused by change of temperature or shrinkage of concrete have to be taken up by the arch.  A two-hinged arch has a hinge at the base of each arch (the springing point), while a three-hinged arch has a third hinge at the crown of the arch.

In a two-hinged arch bridge no bending moments are transferred to the abutments, due to the presence of the hinge.  A change in the relative position of the abutments may cause a change in the thrust load exerted by the arch on the abutments.  The addition of a third hinge at the crown, which allows rotation of the arch members, means that the thrust and shear forces exerted on the abutments are not affected by small movements in either abutment.  Three-hinged arch bridges are, therefore, used when there is the possibility of unequal settlement of the abutments.  Single-hinged arch bridges, with a hinge only at the crown, were also built though in relatively small numbers compared to the other types.

A three hinged bridge is isostatic, that is it is statically determinate; a two-hinged bridge is statically indeterminate in one degree of freedom, while a fixed arch bridge is indeterminate in three degrees of freedom.

History 
Early arch bridges were fixed arches, though the tied-arch bridge, in which a chord restrains the arch ends, was introduced in the 1870s.  The two-hinged bridge was developed by the engineers Couche and Salle in 1858 for a wrought iron bridge carrying the Paris-Creil railway line across the Canal Saint-Denis.  They had attempted to introduce a third hinge at the crown but were unsuccessful because the thickness of the arch was insufficient. 

Hinged bridges were popular with railway companies, who often had the need to construct large bridges.  The Arch Bridge at Bellows Falls in New England, built in 1905, is a particularly large example of a three-hinged arch bridge.  At  in length it was the longest in America when built.  The 1888 Hennepin Avenue Bridge in Minneapolis was unusual in that it was both a two- and three-hinged bridge.  The bridge was split longitudinally with the two halves being built by different companies.  The north arch ribs are three-hinged, while the south arch ribs are two-hinged.  Three-hinged arch bridges remain popular in modern civil engineering.

References 

Bridge design
Arch bridges